Deh-e Borzu (also Romanized as Deh-e Borzū) is a village in Pishkuh-e Zalaqi Rural District, Besharat District, Aligudarz County, Lorestan Province, Iran. At the 2006 census, its population was 76, in 13 families.

References 

Towns and villages in Aligudarz County